François-Joseph Fétis (25 March 1784 – 26 March 1871) was a Belgian musicologist, composer, teacher, and one of the most influential music critics of the 19th century. His enormous compilation of biographical data in the Biographie universelle des musiciens remains an important source of information today.

Family
Fétis was born in Mons, Hainaut, eldest son of Antoine-Joseph Fetis and Elisabeth Desprets, daughter of a famous chirurgical doctor. He had 9 brothers and sisters. His father was titular organist of the noble chapter of Saint-Waltrude. His grandfather was an organ manufacturer. He was trained as a musician by his father and played at young age on the Choir organ of Saint Waltrude.
In October 1806 he married Adélaïde-Louise-Catherine Robert, daughter of the French politician Pierre-François-Joseph Robert and Louise de Keralio, friend of Robespierre. They had 2 sons : most famous was Édouard Fétis, (1812-1909), his eldest son who helped his father with the editions of Revue Musicale and became member of the Royal Academy. In 1866 his wife died, and he had the request to withdraw from the Brussels society and Court. When his father died Eduard inherited his complete library and collection of music instruments.

Career 
His talent for composition manifested itself at the age of seven, and at nine years old he was an organist at Saint Waltrude, Mons. In 1800 he went to Paris and completed his studies at the Conservatory under such masters as Boïeldieu, Jean-Baptiste Rey and Louis-Barthélémy Pradher.

In 1806 he undertook the revision of the Roman liturgical chants in the hope of discovering and establishing their original form. In this year he also began his Biographie universelle des musiciens, the most important of his works, which did not appear until 1834.

In 1821 he was appointed professor at the Paris Conservatory. In 1827 he founded the Revue musicale, the first serious paper in France devoted exclusively to musical matters. Fétis remained in the French capital till 1833, when at the request of Leopold I, he became director of the Royal Conservatory of Brussels and the king's chapelmaster. He also was the founder, and, until his death, the conductor of the celebrated concerts attached to the conservatory of Brussels, and he inaugurated a free series of lectures on musical history and philosophy.

Fétis produced a large quantity of original compositions, from the opera and the oratorio to the simple chanson, including several musical hoaxes, the most famous of which is the "Lute concerto by Valentin Strobel", premiered with Fernando Sor as soloist.  Carcassi, as well as Sor, participated in the performance. The work is attributed NOT to the Alsascian lutenist Valentin Strobel, but to Jean (Johann) Strobach, a member of a prominent Bohemian family of musicians.  This Strobach (fl. 1650–1720) served Leopold I, and there is no evidence that Fetis's score is a hoax.   The composition was published in 1698, although no copy is known to have survived, except Fetis' manuscript score, which is in the Royal Conservatory Library in Brussels.

In 1856, he worked closely with Jean-Baptiste Vuillaume in writing a fascinating treatise about Antonio Stradivari (Antoine Stradivari, luthier célèbre). It includes detailed chapters on the history and development of the violin family, old master Italian violin makers (including the Stradivari and Guarneri families) and an analysis of the bows of François Tourte. His interest in instruments can also be gathered from his very substantial collection, which includes the oldest surviving Arab oud.

Fetis had the privilege to have Paganini, Schumann and Berlioz as contemporaries and to work with the violin maker and dealer, Jean Baptiste Vuillaume. Fetis's work provides a unique window into the times and as such is a particularly valuable reference for the modern researcher, dealer and player.

More important perhaps than his compositions are his writings on music. They are partly historical, such as the Curiosités historiques de la musique (Paris, 1850), and the Histoire générale de la musique (Paris, 1869—1876); and partly theoretical, such as the Méthode des méthodes de piano (Paris, 1840), written in conjunction with Moscheles.

While Fétis's critical opinions of contemporary music may seem conservative, his musicological work was ground-breaking, and unusual for the 19th century in attempting to avoid an ethnocentric and present-centered viewpoint. Unlike many others at the time, he did not see music history as a continuum of increasing excellence, moving towards a goal, but rather as something which was continually changing, neither becoming better nor worse, but continually adapting to new conditions. He believed that all cultures and times created art and music which were appropriate to their times and conditions; and he began a close study of Renaissance music as well as European folk music and music of non-European cultures. Thus Fétis built the foundation for what would later be termed comparative musicology.

Fétis died in Brussels. His valuable library was purchased by the Belgian government and presented to the Royal Library. His historical works, despite many inaccuracies, remain of great value for historians.

His pupils included Luigi Agnesi, Jean-Delphin Alard, Juan Crisóstomo Arriaga, Louise Bertin, William Cusins, Julius Eichberg, Ferdinand Hérold, Frantz Jehin-Prume, Jacques-Nicolas Lemmens, Adolphe Samuel, and Charles-Marie Widor.

Honours 
 : 
 Master of the Royal Music.
 Grand Officer in the Order of Leopold.
 : Commander in the Order of the Oak Crown.
 : Knight of the Order of the Red Eagle.
 : Officer of the Legion of Honour.
Academic Honours
 Member of the Royal Academy of Science, Letters and Fine Arts of Belgium.
 Member of the Academy of Rome.
 Member of the Academy of Berlin.
 Member of the Academy of Vienna.
 Member of the Academy of Stockholm.
 Member of the Academy of London.

Fétis and Berlioz
Some of his criticisms of contemporary composers have become quite famous, as well as the responses that they engendered. He said of Berlioz, "...what Monsieur Berlioz composes is not part of that art which we distinguish as music, and I am completely certain that he lacks the most basic capability in this art." In the Revue musicale issue of 1 February 1835 he wrote of the Symphonie Fantastique:

Berlioz, who had proof-read Fétis' editions of the first eight Beethoven symphonies for the publisher Troupenas, commented that

Troupenas did in fact remove Fétis' editorial marks, but Berlioz was still unsatisfied. He went on to criticize Fétis in one of the monologues of Lélio, ou le Retour à la vie, the 1832 sequel to Symphonie Fantastique:

Not one to be outdone, Fétis may have had the last word in this debate. In the 1845 edition of his treatise La musique mise à la porte de tout le monde, he describes the word "fantastique" saying that "this word has even slid into music. ‘Fantastique' music is composed of instrumental effects with no melodic line and incorrect harmony."

Theoretical work
Although known primarily for his contributions to musicology and criticism, Fétis had effects on the realm of music theory as well. In 1841 he put together the first history of harmonic theory, his Esquisse de l'histoire de l'harmonie. Assembled from individual articles that Fétis published in the Revue et Gazette musicale de Paris around 1840, the book predates Hugo Riemann's more well known Geschichte der Musiktheorie by fifty years. The Esquisse, as the title implies, is a general outline rather than an exhaustive study. Fétis is attempting to show the "facts, errors, and truths" of previous theories and theorists, as he interprets them, in order to provide a solid grounding for other scholars and to prevent subsequent interpretive mistakes.

Fétis' main theoretical work and the culmination of his conceptual frameworks of tonality and harmony is the Traité complet de la théorie et de la pratique de l'harmonie of 1844. This book has influenced later theorists and composers including Paul Hindemith, Ernst Kurth, and Franz Liszt. In the Musik-Lexicon of 1882, Hugo Riemann states that "to [Fétis'] meditations we are indebted for the modern concept of tonality…he found himself emancipated from the spirit of a particular age, and able to render justice to all the various styles of music." Though some other theorists, most notably Matthew Shirlaw, have had decidedly negative views, Riemann's assessment captures the two key features of Fétis' text. Though he did not coin the term "tonality," Fétis developed the concept into its present-day form. He claimed that "tonalité" is the primary organizing agent of all melodic and harmonic successions and that the efforts of other theorists to find the fundamental principle of music in "acoustics, mathematics, aggregations of intervals, or classifications of chords have been futile."

The majority of the Traité complet is devoted to explaining how tonalité organizes music. The primary factor of determining tonality is the scale. It sets out the order of the succession of tones in major and minor (the only two "tonal" modes which he recognizes), the distances which separate the tones, and the resultant melodic and harmonic tendencies. Tonality is not only a governed and conditioned state, but it is a socially conditioned one. Scales are cultural manifestations, resulting from shared experience and education. Nature provides the elements of tonalité, but human understanding, sensibility, and will determine particular harmonic systems. This concept was called a "Metaphysical principle" by Fétis, though Dahlhaus argues that the term is used in this case to denote an anthropological, culturally relative sense in his 1990 book Studies on the Origin of Harmonic Tonality, and theorist Rosalie Schellhous posits that the Kantian term "transcendental" might be more appropriate.

In his comparative work, Fétis attempted "a new method of classifying human races according to their musical systems" following contemporary trends of social darwinism in the emerging fields of ethnology and anthropology.

Harmonic and rhythmic modulation
However, if one wishes to interpret Fétis' metaphysical theory, one of his unique theoretical ideas is laid out in book 3 of the Traité complet, that of harmonic modulation. Fétis argues that tonality has evolved over the course of time through four distinct phases, or ordres:

Unitonic – Resulting from plainchant tonality, the unitonic phase consists mainly of consonant triads with no possibility for modulation due to the lack of the tritone between the 4th and 7th scale degrees. This phase is also referred to by Fétis as tonalité ancienne.
Transitonic – Order which began with the introduction of the dominant 7th chord into harmonic discourse, sometime between Zarlino and Montverdi. This development is also directly related to the codification of cadential systems and periodic phrase structure.
Pluritonic – Modulation is achieved through enharmonic relationships in which one note of a chord is considered the point of contact between different scales. Fétis claims that Mozart was the first to use such modulations as a means of expression. In this order, the diminished 7th and augmented 6th chords become important as they can modulate to several different tonalities.
Omnitonic – The final phase of tonality, and one embodied for Fétis by Wagner, where the alteration of the intervals of natural chords and modification by substitution of notes is so complex that it becomes impossible to identify the original chord. This is seen as a period of extremes, and undesirable compared to the moderately chromatic music of Meyerbeer.

Fétis later applied this same system of ordres to rhythm, "the least advanced part of music...[where] great things remain to be discovered." Though he did not publish these theories in any of his treatises, they appear in several articles for the Revue musicale and in some lectures which had a profound impact on Liszt. Though music had not yet made it past the first phase, Unirhythm, by Fétis' time, he argues that composers may be able to "mutate" from one meter to another within the same melodic phrase. Though Liszt may have been an open disciple of the ideas of the Omnitonic and Omnirhythmic, the influence of such thinking can perhaps be seen most clearly in the music of Brahms, where hemiola and mixing of time signatures is a common occurrence.

"Se i miei sospiri"
The Italian art song, "Se i miei sospiri", appeared in a Paris concert organized by Fétis in 1833. Fétis published the piece for voice and strings in 1838 and then again in 1843 for voice and piano with alternate lyrics ("Pietà, Signore"). It is these alternate lyrics with which the piece is now typically associated. Fétis attributed the song to Alessandro Stradella and claimed to possess an original manuscript of the work but never produced it for examination. As early as 1866, musicologists were questioning the authenticity of the song, and when Fétis' library was acquired by the Royal Library in Brussels after his death, no such manuscript could be found. Owing to this and the fact that the style of the piece is inconsistent with Stradella's own period, the authorship of the piece is now typically attributed to Fétis himself. The original Italian text for the song (Se i miei sospiri) was found set to different music by Alessandro Scarlatti in his 1693 oratorio "The Martyrdom of St. Theodosia".

Publications
Biographies de Joseph et Michael Haydn (Paris, n.d.)
Méthode elementaire et abregée d'harmonie et d'accompagnement (Paris: Petit, 1823)
Traité du contrepoint et de la fugue... (Paris: Charles Michael Ozu, 1824)
Revue musicale (Paris, 1827–35)
Curiosités historiques de la musique, complément nécessaire de la musique mise à la portée de tout le monde (Paris: Janet et Cotelle, 1830)
Biographie universelle des musiciens et bibliographie générale de la musique (Brussels, 1833–1844 [8 vols.])
Traité du chant en choeur (Paris, 1837)
Esquisse de l'histoire de l'harmonie considérée comme art et comme science systématique (Paris, 1840). 
Traité complet de la théorie et de la pratique de l'harmonie (Paris and Brussels, 1844)
Antoine Stradivari, luthier célèbre (Paris, 1856)
Histoire générale de la musique (Paris, 1869–76; 5 vls., unfinished)

Notes

References

Compositions

Ensembles 

 String Quartet No. 1
 String Quartet No. 2
 Grand Sextet, Op. 5

Overture 

 Ouverture de concert à grand orchestre

Concerto 

 1869: Flute Concerto in B-minor

Symphony 

 1862: Symphony No. 1 in Eb-major
 Symphonic Fantasy for organ and orchestra

Mass 

 Messe di Requiem

Songs 

 Se i miei sospiri

External links

Scores

Texts and books
Books with "Fétis" as author (Google Books)
Books with occurrences of "Fétis" (Google Books)
Texts with occurrences of "Fétis" (archive.org)
 Biographie universelle des musiciens (2nd edition) at Google Books:
 Vol. 1, 1860 (478 pages) Aaron – Bohrer (+vol. 2)
 Vol. 2, 1861 (484 pages) Boildieu – Derossi (+vol. 1)
 Vol. 3, 1862 (480 pages) Désargus – Giardini
 Vol. 4, 1862 (491 pages) Gibbons – Kazynski
 Vol. 5, 1863 (480 pages) Kechlina – Martini (+vol. 6)
 Vol. 6, 1864 (496 pages) Martini, leP – Pérolle (+vol. 5)
 Vol. 7, 1864 (548 pages) Perotti – Scultetus (+vol. 8)
 Vol. 8, 1865 (527 pages) Sebastiani – Zyka (+vol. 7)
 Biographie universelle des musiciens (supplement by Arthur Pougin) at Google Books:
 Vol. 1, 1878 (480 pages) Abadie – Holmes
 Vol. 2, 1880 (691 pages) Holmes, Mlle Augusta – Zwingli
 
 

1784 births
1871 deaths
19th-century classical composers
19th-century Belgian male musicians
Belgian classical composers
Belgian male classical composers
Belgian musicologists
Belgian music critics
Belgian music educators
Belgian music theorists
Romantic composers
Book and manuscript collectors
Historicist composers
Academic staff of the Conservatoire de Paris
Conservatoire de Paris alumni
Members of the Royal Academy of Belgium
Prix de Rome for composition
Royal Library of Belgium
People from Mons
Walloon people
Musical hoaxes